Herbert Svavar Arnarson (born May 4, 1970) is an Icelandic former basketball player and a former member of Icelandic national team. In 1995, he was the second player to be named both the Úrvalsdeild karla Domestic Player of the Year and the Young Player of the Year in the same season. In 1998 he helped Racing Antwerpen to the Belgian Basketball League finals where it lost to Spirou Charleroi.

College
After playing for Madisonville High School, Herbert joined Kentucky Wesleyan College where he became NCAA Division II champion in 1990.

Icelandic national team
From 1991 to 2002, Herbert played 111 games for the Icelandic national team.

Awards and accomplishments

Titles
NCAA Division II: 1990
Icelandic Supercup: 1998

Individual awards
Icelandic Men's Basketball Player of the Year: 2000
Úrvalsdeild Domestic All-First team (3): 1995, 1996, 1999
Úrvalsdeild Domestic Player of the Year: 1995
Úrvalsdeild Young Player of the Year: 1995

References

External links
Herbert Arnarson stats at kki.is

1970 births
Living people
Herbert Arnarson
Herbert Arnarson
Herbert Arnarson
Herbert Arnarson
Herbert Arnarson
Kentucky Wesleyan Panthers men's basketball players
Herbert Arnarson
Herbert Arnarson
Herbert Arnarson
Herbert Arnarson
Herbert Arnarson
Herbert Arnarson
Herbert Arnarson
Guards (basketball)